Potrero Cerrado is a district of the Oreamuno canton, in the Cartago province of Costa Rica.

Geography 
Potrero Cerrado has an area of  km² and an elevation of  metres.

Climate
Potrero Cerrado has a subtropical highland climate (Cfb) with moderate rainfall from January to April and heavy rainfall from May to December.

Demographics 

For the 2011 census, Potrero Cerrado had a population of  inhabitants.

Transportation

Road transportation 
The district is covered by the following road routes:
 National Route 219
 National Route 401

References 

Districts of Cartago Province
Populated places in Cartago Province